Jan Hudec Jr. (born August 19, 1981) is a Czech-Canadian alpine ski racer who previously represented Canada until 2016 and specializes in the speed events of downhill and super-G. Beset by injuries for several seasons, he returned to World Cup form in 2012 at age 30 and gained his second victory. At the 2014 Winter Olympics, Hudec won the bronze medal in the super-G at Rosa Khutor. It was the first Olympic medal for Canada in men's alpine skiing in 20 years.

Early life
Born in Šumperk, Czechoslovakia, Hudec defected in a homemade raft with his parents to West Germany while an infant. The family moved to Canada in 1986 and settled in Red Deer, Alberta, where Jan Sr. was a ski coach. In 1993 the Hudecs, now a family of four with younger brother Phil, moved to Banff where both parents worked at the Banff Mountain Ski Academy.

Career 
Hudec emerged as a World Cup downhiller in February 2007; he won the silver medal in downhill at the 2007 World Championships in Åre, Sweden, followed up with a fifth place at Garmisch, Germany. That November he won his first World Cup event, a downhill in Lake Louise, but suffered a season-ending knee injury while training in Switzerland two months later. In January 2009, Hudec had a comeback at the Lauberhorn downhill in Wengen, Switzerland, where he finished eighth, but three weeks later an injury at the 2009 World Championships downhill in Val-d'Isère, France, ended his 2009 season.

In the following two seasons, Hudec battled injuries and had just one top-ten result, a tenth-place finish in March 2011. His results improved significantly in the 2012 season, which included his second World Cup victory in February at the Kandahar downhill in Chamonix, France. Later that month he ascended his first World Cup super-G podium as the runner-up at Crans-Montana, Switzerland.

At the 2014 Olympics in Sochi, Hudec competed in several events, and was twentieth in the downhill. Hudec next competed in the super-G and won bronze, tied with Bode Miller. After the race he noted to local media that had buried a lucky loonie at the finish line of the race. Upon commenting he noted to CBC Sports that "Who cares if it helped. That loonie is worth more than a buck now, I can tell you that." The medal was the first for Canada in alpine skiing at the Olympics in twenty years.

Left off Canada's team for the 2016–17 season, Hudec competed for the Czech Republic at the 2017 World Championships and 2018 Winter Olympics.

In 2019, the native Welsh band 'Papur Wal' released a song commemorating Hudec's childhood and career. Called 'Yn Y Weriniaeth Tsiec' the song translates from Welsh to 'In The Czech Republic'. An upbeat indie classic, the song proved to be a hit in Wales especially among the indie music scene in the country which is spearheaded by the nations young people. Hudec was shown the song recently he described it as 'the best song I've ever heard' following on by thanking Papur Wal and expressing his love and gratitude to the Welsh people and Wales as a country.

World Cup results

Season standings

Top ten finishes
 2 wins – (2 DH)
 5 podiums – (3 DH, 2 SG)

Videos
 FIS Alpine.com – Jan Hudec speaks Czech (with Ondřej Bank) and talks about his roots – 2011-03-12
 YouTube.com – Hudec's winning DH run at Lake Louise – 2007-11-24
 YouTube.com – Jan Hudec wins at Chamonix – from Universal Sports – 2012-02-03

World Championship results

Olympic results

References

External links
 
 Jan Hudec World Cup standings at the International Ski Federation
 
 
 
Rossignol.com – team – alpine – Jan Hudec
 Alpine Canada.org – national ski team – athletes – Jan Hudec

1981 births
Canadian male alpine skiers
Czech male alpine skiers
Alpine skiers at the 2010 Winter Olympics
Alpine skiers at the 2014 Winter Olympics
Alpine skiers at the 2018 Winter Olympics
Olympic alpine skiers of Canada
Medalists at the 2014 Winter Olympics
Olympic medalists in alpine skiing
Olympic bronze medalists for Canada
Czechoslovak emigrants to Canada
Naturalized citizens of Canada
Canadian people of Czech descent
People from Šumperk
Sportspeople from Red Deer, Alberta
Olympic alpine skiers of the Czech Republic
Living people